The Centre for Land Warfare Studies (CLAWS), New Delhi, India is an autonomous think tank  on strategic studies and land warfare. The mandate of CLAWS covers national security issues, conventional military operations and sub-conventional warfare.  CLAWS is registered under the Societies Registration Act, 1860 and is a membership-based organisation. It is governed by a Board of Governors and an Executive Council. Research at CLAWS is futuristic in outlook and policy-oriented in approach. CLAWS disseminate the products of its research to its members, members of the armed forces, decision makers, members of the strategic community and interested civilians. It also seeks to contribute to developing a pro-active strategic culture for India. The objective of the organization is to convey policy recommendations based on interactions, consensus and research projects to policymakers and experts. CLAWS has been ranked 67th amongst World Top Defence and National Security Think Tanks as per '2017 Global Go To Think Tank Report' published by University of Pennsylvania, USA.

Vision 

The motto of CLAWS is "Victory through Vision". It encapsulates the founding idea of employing academic and practical research to provide actionable knowledge to the strategic community of India and the world.

The vision of CLAWS is to join leading international think tanks in conceptualizing various aspects of land warfare, with special reference to India and its extended neighborhood. CLAWS aspires to attract leading strategic thinkers, defense analysts, scholars and academicians and media persons to deliberate on all facets of land warfare at all levels.

Areas of interest 

The mandate of CLAWS covers national security issues, conventional military operations and sub-conventional warfare. The Centre also focuses on conflicts in the region and military developments in countries within India's strategic frontiers, particularly those in the South Asian region. The expanded areas of interest are:
 National Security
 Conventional Military Operations
 Defence Cooperation
 Defence Technology (Cyber Domain, Electronic & Communications Domain, Space Domain, Land Based Conventional Platforms)
 NBC Issues
 China
 Pakistan
 Regional Security (Sri Lanka, Bangladesh, Bhutan, Nepal, Afghanistan, Maldives)
 Sub-conventional Conflict, Terrorism

Leadership 

List of CLAWS Directors

       
CLAWS team comprises serving and retired defence personnel from all services, civilian experts and support staff.

Activities 

CLAWS is involved in primary and secondary research which is qualitative and quantitative in nature. The topics are contemporary and security oriented  having a bearing on India's national security and interests. On its website, CLAWS publishes research articles
and reports on workshops, conferences, round-table discussions and guest lectures. The organisation undertakes research projects on national security-related issues, especially those pertaining to land warfare.

Major publications 

CLAWS conducts research that is futuristic in outlook and policy-oriented in approach. CLAWS follows a set of publication guidelines in terms of types, content, language, design and printing. 

 Publication of the CLAWS Journal commenced in November 2007. It is a bi-annual publication (summer and winter editions). 
 The CLAWS Scholar Warrior was published beginning in autumn 2010.  It is a bi-annual journal published in spring and autumn. 
 CLAWS Issue Briefs first went to press in 2008. This quarterly publication consists of short analytical essays that examine current security issues. 
 Publication of the CLAWS Manekshaw Papers began in 2008. Issued monthly, Manekshaw Papers are researched papers on issues of strategic significance.

Other publications by faculty 

 COVID-19 and Its Challenges: Is India Future Ready?, Lt. General Vijay Kumar Ahluwalia and Amrita Jash
 The Concept of Active Defence in China's Military Strategy, Amrita Jash

See also
Indian Army
Centre for Air Power Studies (India)
Institute for Defence Studies and Analyses
United Service Institution

See also 
 List of think tanks in India

References

External links 
India Strategic Publications
http://csis.org/expert/gurmeet-kanwal
https://web.archive.org/web/20130217134846/http://www.coedat.nato.int/brifing/COE-DAT_BRIEFING.pdf
http://www.cdeamu.ac.in/vc.php
http://sainiksamachar.nic.in/englisharchives/2008/jul15-08/h2.html
https://web.archive.org/web/20160304025920/http://www.aninews.in/newsdetail2/story86104/sino-india-military-cooperation-can-ensure-secure-stable-environment-for-both-nations-j-j-singh.html
http://www.dsalert.org/about-us/our-contributors
https://web.archive.org/web/20131106050155/http://brahmos.com/newscenter.php?newsid=76
http://www.nias.res.in/docs/CV-Manabrata-Guha.pdf

2004 establishments in Delhi
Security organizations
Think tanks based in India
Research institutes in Delhi
Think tanks established in 2004